Chanaz is a commune in the Savoie department in the Auvergne-Rhône-Alpes region in Southeastern France. In 2018, it had a population of 524.

See also
Communes of the Savoie department
Canal de Savières

References

External links

Official site

Communes of Savoie